The Ḥawqala or the La Hawla is an Arabic term referring to the Arabic statement  which is usually translated as "There is no power nor strength except by God." 

This expression is mentioned by a Muslim when seized by a calamity or in a situation beyond their control, usually when being oppressed or forcefully put through suffering. The word Ḥawqala is a portmanteau (or naḥt) of the words ḥawla and quwwata.

See also
 Basmala
 Tasbih
 Dhikr

References

Arabic words and phrases